Beylikdüzü—Sondurak is the western terminus of the Istanbul Metrobus Bus rapid transit line. It is located along Büyükçekmece Road adjacent to the D.100 state highway. It is the easternmost public transport station in Istanbul.

Beylikdüzü—Sondurak station was opened on 19 July 2012 as part of the westward expansion of the line.

References

External links
Beylikdüzü—Sondurak station
Beylikdüzü—Sondurak in Google Street View

Istanbul Metrobus stations
2012 establishments in Turkey
Beylikdüzü